Merzifon District is a district of Amasya Province of Turkey. Its seat is the city Merzifon. Its area is 888 km2, and its population is 74,727 (2021).

Composition
There is one municipality in Merzifon District:
 Merzifon

There are 70 villages in Merzifon District:

 Akören
 Akpınar
 Aksungur
 Aktarla
 Alıcık
 Alişar
 Aşağıbük
 Bahçecik
 Balgöze
 Bayat
 Bayazıt
 Bulak
 Büyükçay
 Çamlıca
 Çavundur
 Çaybaşı
 Çayırköy
 Çayırözü
 Çobanören
 Demirpınar
 Derealan
 Diphacı
 Elmayolu
 Esentepe
 Eymir
 Gelinsini
 Gökçebağ
 Gümüştepe
 Hacet
 Hacıyakup
 Hanköy
 Hayrettinköy
 Hırka
 İnalanı
 Kamışlı
 Karacakaya
 Karamağara
 Karamustafapaşa
 Karatepe
 Karşıyaka
 Kayadüzü
 Kıreymir
 Kızıleğrek
 Koçköy
 Küçükçay
 Kuyuköy
 Mahmutlu
 Muşruf
 Ortabük
 Ortaova
 Osmanoğlu
 Oymaağaç
 Oymak
 Pekmezci
 Saraycık
 Sarıbuğday
 Sarıköy
 Sazlıca
 Selimiye
 Şeyhyeni
 Türkoğlu
 Uzunyazı
 Yakupköy
 Yalnız
 Yaylacık
 Yenice
 Yeşilören
 Yeşiltepe
 Yolüstü
 Yukarıbük

References

Districts of Amasya Province